Tomasz Ścigaczewski (born 18 November 1978, in Zgierz) is a former Polish hurdler.

His personal best time for the 110 m hurdles is 13.29 seconds, achieved in June 1999 in Oslo. This ranks him second among Polish 110 m hurdlers, only behind Artur Kohutek.

Competition record

References

External links

1978 births
Living people
Polish male hurdlers
Athletes (track and field) at the 2000 Summer Olympics
Olympic athletes of Poland
People from Zgierz
Sportspeople from Łódź Voivodeship
20th-century Polish people